The men's decathlon event at the 1974 British Commonwealth Games was held on 26 and 27 January  at the Queen Elizabeth II Park in Christchurch, New Zealand.

Results

References

Day 1 results
Day 2 results

Athletics at the 1974 British Commonwealth Games
1974